Manfred Trauten (born 5 July 1958) is a German boxer. He competed in the men's middleweight event at the 1980 Summer Olympics.

References

External links
 

1958 births
Living people
German male boxers
Olympic boxers of East Germany
Boxers at the 1980 Summer Olympics
People from Schönebeck
Middleweight boxers
Sportspeople from Saxony-Anhalt